Louis Goodman may refer to:

Louis Earl Goodman (1892–1961), United States federal judge
Louis S. Goodman (1906–2000), pharmacologist and chemotherapy pioneer
Louis W. Goodman, international relations scholar